Anasimyia is a genus of wetland hoverflies with aquatic larvae. The genus was formerly regarded as a subgenus of the similar Lejops, and recently elevated to genus.

Species
 Anasimyia anausis (moon-shaped swamp fly)
 Anasimyia annulipes (Macquart, 1850)
 Anasimyia bilinearis (Williston, 1887) (two-lined swamp fly)
 Anasimyia borealis (Cole, 1921)
 Anasimyia chrysostoma (Wiedemann, 1830) (lump-legged swamp fly)
 Anasimyia contracta Claussen & Torp, 1980
 Anasimyia diffusa Locke, Skevington & Vockeroth, 2019 (smooth-legged swamp fly)
 Anasimyia distincta (Williston, 1887) (short-spurred swamp fly)
 Anasimyia femorata Simic, 1987
 Anasimyia grisescens (Hull 1943) (long-spurred swamp fly)
 Anasimyia interpuncta (Harris, 1776)
 Anasimyia inundata (Violovitsh, 1979)
 Anasimyia japonica (Shiraki, 1930)
 Anasimyia lineata (Fabricius, 1787)
 Anasimyia lunulata (Meigen, 1822)
 Anasimyia matutina Locke, Skevington & Vockeroth, 2019 (small-spotted swamp fly)
 Anasimyia perfidiosus (Hunter, 1897) (treacherous swamp fly)
 Anasimyia smirnovi (Stackelberg, 1924)
 Anasimyia subtransfugus (Stackelberg, 1963)
 Anasimyia transfuga (Linnaeus, 1758)

Gallery

References

Hoverfly genera
Eristalinae